Interstate 94 (I-94) runs east–west through the western, central, and southeastern portions of the US state of Wisconsin.

Route description

The route, cosigned with US Highway 12 (US 12), enters from Minnesota just east of the Twin Cities. The route passes north of Menomonie and south of Eau Claire before turning southeast and heading toward Tomah where it joins I-90. The two Interstates run concurrently for the next  to Madison. I-94 enters the state as a six-lane facility which reduces to four-lane at exit 4 (US 12).

I-94 passes by the popular tourist destination of Wisconsin Dells.

This concurrency is the longest three-route concurrency of the Interstate Highway System and only one of two in existence. The interchanges mark a return to a six-lane configuration.

I-94 turns eastward toward Milwaukee at what is commonly known as the "Badger Interchange" where the three Interstates meet with State Trunk Highway 30 (WISS 30). The highway returns to four lanes after the interchange traffic merges, then returns to six lanes just west of Waukesha. The highway remains a six-lane facility (with various auxiliary and collector–distributor lanes in Milwaukee at interchanges) east and south of this point, and through the area is officially designated the East–West Freeway, though very few organizations, including the Wisconsin Department of Transportation's traffic control center in the area actually use that name.

I-94 leaves Milwaukee to the south, joining with I-41 at the Mitchell Interchange. These two Interstates run concurrently to the border, passing west of Racine and Kenosha on their way into Illinois toward Chicago. Traffic is heavy along this stretch.

Speed limits 

History
I-94 was the first section of the Interstate Highway System completed within the state of Wisconsin. This  section, between the unincorporated town of Goerke's Corners (currently at the intersection of US 18 and Barker Road) and Waukesha was built in 1956. The route was added segment-by-segment over the years and was completed to its current alignment on November 4, 1969. The routing through Milwaukee displaced thousands of residents and businesses. A  stretch between Lincoln and Greenfield avenues displaced 411 homes and 45 businesses. Milwaukee continues to see millions of dollars in lost tax revenue as a result of the freeway routing through the heart of the city.

From 2004 until 2008, a portion of I-94 in Milwaukee was reconstructed as a part of the Marquette Interchange project.

Current construction
This includes a complete rebuild of the roadway and reconstruction of frontage roads and interchanges including a new design of the Mitchell Interchange in Milwaukee County.

Exit list

Auxiliary routes
Two spur routes of I-94 exist in Wisconsin, both are in the Milwaukee metropolitan area. I-794 is a spur in downtown that accesses the southeast suburbs and the Port of Milwaukee. It is known as the East–West Freeway from I-94 to Lincoln Memorial Drive and as the Lake Freeway from there to Carferry Drive. I-894 is a southwest bypass of the city that is known as the Zoo Freeway from the I-94 Zoo Interchange to I-43 at the Hale Interchange and as the Airport Freeway from there to I-94 at the Mitchell Interchange.

References

External links

511wi.gov, Milwaukee-to-Kenosha construction project website from the Wisconsin Department of Transportation
I-94 at Wisconsin Highways

 Wisconsin
94
Freeways in the Milwaukee area
Transportation in St. Croix County, Wisconsin
Transportation in Dunn County, Wisconsin
Transportation in Eau Claire County, Wisconsin
Transportation in Trempealeau County, Wisconsin
Transportation in Jackson County, Wisconsin
Transportation in Monroe County, Wisconsin
Transportation in Juneau County, Wisconsin
Transportation in Sauk County, Wisconsin
Transportation in Columbia County, Wisconsin
Transportation in Dane County, Wisconsin
Transportation in Jefferson County, Wisconsin
Transportation in Waukesha County, Wisconsin
Transportation in Milwaukee County, Wisconsin
Transportation in Racine County, Wisconsin
Transportation in Kenosha County, Wisconsin